In the 1961 Virginia gubernatorial election, incumbent Governor J. Lindsay Almond, a Democrat, was unable to seek re-election due to term limits. H. Clyde Pearson was nominated by the Republican Party to run against former Democratic Attorney General of Virginia Albertis Harrison.

Candidates
Albertis S. Harrison, Jr., former Attorney General of Virginia (D), who defeated Allie Edward Stakes Stephens.
H. Clyde Pearson, (R), former member of the Virginia House of Delegates

Results

References

Gubernatorial
1961
Virginia
November 1961 events in the United States